Dajan Ahmet (born Dajan Ahmetov , also known by the pseudonyms of Jaan Võõramaa and Võõramaa Jean; 22 January 1962 – 4 November 2006) was an Estonian actor and stage director of Tatar heritage.

Biography
Ahmet was born in Tallinn. He was a 1988 graduate of the Tallinn State Conservatory. Ahmet was one of the founders and leaders of the Salong-Teater and the Lasteteater Trumm in Tallinn. In the summer of 2006, Ahmet joined the Rakvere Theatre.

On 4 November 2006, Ahmet was among a group of seven individuals, including actors Anne Veesaar, Rednar Annus, Ksenia Argakova, and Marika Korolev, that were travelling to the Vanemuine theatre in Tartu in a Hyundai Trajet. Near Mõhküla in Põltsamaa Parish, the vehicle collided with a Ford Mondeo. Ahmet was killed instantly. The driver of the Trajet, another male passenger, Annus, Veesaar, Argakova, and Korolev were all injured. A man and woman in the Ford Mondeo also died at the scene of the accident and two small children, passengers in the Mondeo, were also injured.

References

External links

Sources
 Sirp 10 November 2006: Dajan Ahmet 22. I 1962 – 4. XI 2006

1962 births
2006 deaths
Estonian theatre directors
Estonian people of Tatar descent
Estonian male television actors
Estonian male film actors
Road incident deaths in Estonia
20th-century Estonian male actors
Male actors from Tallinn
Estonian Academy of Music and Theatre alumni
Burials at Liiva Cemetery